State Route 349 (SR 349) is a state highway in Greene County within the U.S. state of Tennessee.

Route description
SR 349 connects SR 340 just south of Warrensburg to US 321/SR 35 on the south side of Greeneville. It travels through farmland and rural areas for its entire length, not passing through any other communities or towns. SR 349 is known as Warrensburg Road for its entire duration.

Major intersections

References

349
Transportation in Greene County, Tennessee